The Association of Holocaust Organizations (AHO), a 501(c)(3), was established in 1985 to serve as an international network of organizations and individuals for the advancement of Holocaust education, remembrance and research. Among its functions and services are: annual conferences, a winter seminar, regional conferences, co-sponsorship of other conferences and seminars, a listserv for members, a website, and the publication of an annual print directory.

The AHO is governed by a nine-member board of directors, which is elected by and from the membership at its annual business meeting. The term of office is three years. The AHO is run on a voluntary basis. Membership dues cover the expenses of the organization.

AHO Website

The AHO website is a significant resource for networking among the various organizations. The website includes a Members Directory, Affiliated Members, Archives and Traveling Exhibits pages. The Members Directory which alphabetically lists the countries which have AHO members in them as well their major contact information. The Traveling Exhibit page shows the available exhibits for rent by their "home" museums' the page also has descriptions, contact information, availability of the exhibits.

Organizations

The various organizations: museums, Holocaust centers, and memorial organizations receive funding from multiple sources.

Membership

In order to become a member, an organization or individual must meet a certain criteria and be voted in by the board. The criteria are: An organization or individual must be involved in Holocaust education, remembrance or research. Full organization members and individual members pay annual dues, while affiliated organizational members do not.

External links 

 

Holocaust-related organizations
Organizations established in 1985
1985 establishments in the United States